Benjamin Starke (born 25 November 1986 in Cottbus, Brandenburg, East Germany) is an Olympic swimmer from Germany. He swam for Germany at the 2008 Olympics and the 2012 Olympics.

He has swum for Germany at:
Olympics: 2008, 2012
World Championships: 2005, 2007, and 2011
Short Course Worlds: 2010

See also
:de:Benjamin Starke—Starke's entry on German Wikipedia
www.benjaminstarke.de—Starke's website

References

External links 
 
 

Living people
1986 births
Sportspeople from Cottbus
German male swimmers
Olympic swimmers of Germany
Swimmers at the 2008 Summer Olympics
Swimmers at the 2012 Summer Olympics
World Aquatics Championships medalists in swimming